Sogliano al Rubicone is a comune (municipality) in the Province of Forlì-Cesena in the Italian region Emilia-Romagna, located about  southeast of Bologna and about  southeast of Forlì.

Sogliano al Rubicone is renowned for the Formaggio di Fossa cheese.

Twin towns
 Meziboří, Czech Republic
 Sayda, Germany

References

External links
  Official website

Cities and towns in Emilia-Romagna